Gerardo Victorino Varela Alfonso (born 15 June 1963) is a Chilean politician and lawyer.

Political thought
In educational matters, he had expressed in different columns of rightist newspapers El Mercurio and El Líbero that «the Education is a right and also an economic good».

Controversies
In April 2018, Varela referred to the subject of condoms, which he indicated that he personally bought them for his children and also that they needed more than three because «they were champions», wedge that was widely criticized by the public opinion. Then, the next month ―and amid 2018 Chilean feminist protests— he referred to the harassment of women during a speech in the Senate, where he mentioned that them are «small humiliations».

Personal life
He is grandson of Pedro Enrique Alfonso, a politician from centre-right faction of the Chilean Radical Party who was candidate in 1952 presidential elections won by Carlos Ibáñez del Campo.

References

External links
 

1963 births
Living people
20th-century Chilean lawyers
University of Chile alumni
21st-century Chilean politicians
Chilean Ministers of Education